The Mayall Bruner House is a historic house at 36 Magnolia Avenue in the Newton Corner neighborhood of Newton, Massachusetts.  Built in 1923, it is a well-preserved example of Craftsman architecture.  It was listed on the National Register of Historic Places in 1990.

Description and history
The Mayall Bruner House stands in a residential area on the south side of Newton Corner, on the west side of Magnolia Avenue south of Kenrick Street.   It is a -story wood-frame structure, with a complex roofline that includes two front facing gables joined by a high cross ridge.  At the sides the gable roofs extend further downward, to garden gate on one side and the main entrance on the other.  The entry is sheltered by a hip-roof portico with a segmented-arch opening.  Windows are of differing shapes and sizes, with one sash window topped by a rounded-arch fixed-pane window, and another that is a three-part picture window.  The front-facing gables each have narrow four-over-four windows near their peaks.  The south facade is defined by banks of tripled sash windows on both levels.

The house was built in 1923 to a design by Arthur H. Bowditch, a Boston-based architect best known for his commercial buildings. The house is an excellent local example of rustic Craftsman styling.  Its exterior has been little altered since construction; the most prominent change is the installation of the picture window, probably in the 1960s.  Mayall Bruner was a wool merchant with offices in Boston.

See also
 National Register of Historic Places listings in Newton, Massachusetts

References

Houses on the National Register of Historic Places in Newton, Massachusetts
Houses completed in 1923